Kwang-sik, also spelled Kwang-shik or Gwang-sik, is a Korean masculine given name. Its meaning differs based on the hanja used to write each syllable of the name. There are 13 hanja with the reading "kwang" and 16 hanja with the reading "sik" on the South Korean government's official list of hanja which may be registered for use in given names.

People with this name include:
Yi Gwang-sik (1493), Joseon Dynasty politician
Myung Kwang-sik (born 1940), South Korean hapkido pioneer
Choe Kwang-shik (born 1953), South Korean politician
Ri Gwang-sik (born 1970), North Korean boxer
Kim Kwang-sik (born 1972), South Korean film director
Jeong Kwang-sik (born 1985), South Korean footballer
Song Kwang-sik, South Korean pianist

See also
List of Korean given names

References

Korean masculine given names